The USC Trojans football statistical leaders are individual statistical leaders of the USC Trojans football program in various categories, including passing, rushing, receiving, total offense, defensive stats, and kicking/special teams. Within those areas, the lists identify single-game, single-season, and career leaders. The Trojans represent the University of Southern California in the NCAA's Pac-12 Conference.

Although USC began competing in intercollegiate football in 1888, the school's official record book considers the "modern era" to have begun in the 1920s. Records from before this decade are often incomplete and inconsistent, and they are generally not included in these lists.

These lists are dominated by more recent players for several reasons:
 Since 1920s, seasons have increased from 10 to 11 and then 12 games in length.
 The NCAA didn't allow freshmen to play varsity football until 1972 (with the exception of the World War II years), allowing players to have four-year careers.
 The Trojans have played in 55 bowl games in school history, 35 of which have come since the 1970 season. Although the official NCAA record book does not include bowl games in statistical records until 2002, and most colleges also structure their record books this way, USC counts all bowl games in its records.

These lists are updated through the end of the 2017 season. Recent USC Football Media Guides do not include full top 10 lists for single-game records. However, the 2003 version of the media guide included long lists of top individual single-game performances, and box scores from more recent games are readily available, so the lists are easily derived.

Passing

Passing yards

Passing touchdowns

Rushing

Rushing yards

Rushing touchdowns

Receiving

Receptions

Receiving yards

Receiving touchdowns

Total offense
Total offense is the sum of passing and rushing statistics. It does not include receiving or returns.

Total offense yards

Total touchdowns

Defense
Note: The USC Football Media Guide does not generally give a full top 10 in defensive statistics.

Interceptions

Tackles

Sacks

Special teams

Field goals made

Field goal percentage

References

USC